Electric transient may refer to:

Physical phenomena:
 Transient response
 Transient (oscillation)
 Transient recovery voltage
 Voltage spike
 Voltage droop
 Inrush current

Software:
 SPICE transient simulation mode

Electricity